International Territorial Level (ITL) is a geocode standard for referencing the subdivisions of the United Kingdom for statistical purposes, used by the Office for National Statistics (ONS). From 2003 and until 2020 it functioned as part of the European Union and European Statistical System's geocode standard Nomenclature of Territorial Units for Statistics or NUTS.

Following Brexit, the ONS set to develop a domestic statistical classification framework separate from NUTS. Currently, the ITLs are a mirror to the pre-existing NUTS system, they retain the same three level hierarchy and boundaries used for NUTS in the United Kingdom since 2018, with the next review scheduled for 2024. ITLs are set to follow a similar review timetable to NUTS, being reviewed every three years. The ONS will develop new official GSS codes of ITL geography aligned with the existing NUTS codes. From 1 January 2021, the ONS encourages "ITL" be used as a replacement to the "NUTS" designation, with lookups between NUTS and ITL maintained and published until 2023.

The current ITL classification is a mirror of the previous NUTS classification with slight modification, the ONS lists 12 regions at ITL 1, 41 regions at ITL 2, and 179 regions at ITL 3. "UK" in the NUTS codes were replaced with "TL".

The last NUTS classification is dated 21 November 2016 and was effective from 1 January 2018, listed 12 regions at NUTS 1, 40 regions at NUTS 2, and 174 regions at NUTS 3 level.

NUTS 2018 codes

NUTS 2015 codes (now superseded)

Demographic statistics by ITL 1 region 

The 12 ITL regions of the United Kingdom are listed below. Population numbers are for mid-2019 (as NUTS 1), and areas are in square kilometres. Data is from the Office for National Statistics.

History

NUTS 2003 

In the first version in 2003, North Eastern Scotland (which then included part of Moray) was coded UKM1, and Highlands and Islands was coded UKM4.

The current NUTS level 1 codes start with "C" (following "UK") rather than "1" because the new list reflected the revised regions of England and local government changes throughout the UK; "1" to "B" had been used for the 11 regions in the previous coding system.

NUTS 2006 

NUTS 2006 came into force on 1 January 2008.

NUTS 2010 

NUTS 2010 came into force on 1 January 2012.

2010 changes to NUTS 2 also resulting in changes with NUTS 3 regions

 The combined area of UKD2 (Cheshire pre-2010) and UKD5 (Merseyside pre-2010) were replaced by UKD6 (Cheshire post-2010) and UKD7 (Merseyside post-2010), due to the transfer of Halton to the Merseyside NUTS region from Cheshire. This resulted in the following changes to the underlying NUTS 3 areas:  UKD22 (Cheshire CC) being split into UKD62 (Cheshire East) and UKD63 (Cheshire West and Chester); The areas of Liverpool, Sefton and Wirral were not changed as NUTS 3 areas however to reflect their transfer within NUTS 2 areas were respectively renumbered from (UKD52 to UKD72; UKD53 to UKD 73 and UKD54 to UKD 74). The two areas of UKD51 (East Merseyside pre 2010) and UKD21 (Halton and Warrington) were amended by the transfer of Halton from the latter to former to form the new areas of UKD71 (East Merseyside post-2010) and UKD61 (Warrington).

2010 changes to NUTS 3 areas without changes occurring to NUTS 2 areas

 UKE43 (Calderdale, Kirklees and Wakefield) was replaced by UKE44 (Calderdale and Kirklees) and UKE45 (Wakefield)
 UKF23 (Northamptonshire) was replaced by UKF24 (West Northamptonshire) and UKF25 (North Northamptonshire)
 UKG34 (Dudley and Sandwell) was replaced by UKG36 (Dudley) and UKG37 (Sandwell)
 UKG35 (Walsall and Wolverhampton) was replaced by UKG38 (Walsall) and UKG39 (Wolverhampton).
 Bedfordshire CC UKH22 was replaced by UKH24 (Bedford) and UKH25 (Central Bedfordshire)

NUTS 2013 

NUTS 2013 came into force on 1 January 2015.

2015 changes to NUTS 3 areas without changes to NUTS 2 areas:

 UKJ42 (Kent CC) was replaced by UKJ43 (Kent Thames Gateway) UKJ44 (East Kent) UKJ45 (Mid Kent) UKJ46 (West Kent)
 UKJ23 (Surrey) was replaced by UKJ25 (West Surrey) and UKJ26 (East Surrey)
 UKJ24 (West Sussex) was replaced by UKJ27 (West Sussex South West) and UKJ28 (West Sussex North East)
 UKJ33 (Hampshire CC) was replaced by UKJ35 (South Hampshire), UKJ36 (Central Hampshire), UKJ37 (North Hampshire)
 UKD43 (Lancashire CC) was replaced by UKD44 (Lancaster and Wyre), UKD45 (Mid Lancashire), UKD46 (East Lancashire) and UKD47 (Chorley and West Lancashire)
 UKD31 (Greater Manchester South) was replaced by UKD33 (Manchester), UKD34 (Greater Manchester South West) and UKD35 (Greater Manchester South East)
 UKD32 (Greater Manchester North) was replaced by UKD36 (Greater Manchester North West) and UKD37 (Greater Manchester North East)
 UKH13 (Norfolk) was replaced by UKH15 (Norwich and East Norfolk), UKH16 (North and West Norfolk) and UKH17 (Breckland and South Norfolk)
 UKH33 (Essex CC) was replaced by UKH34 (Essex Haven Gateway), UKH35 (West Essex), UKH36 (Heart of Essex) and UKH37 (Essex Thames Gateway)

In 2015 the Greater London NUTS 1 area was left unchanged however the previous NUTS 2 area of inner and outer London were abolished and with the previous NUTS 3 areas becoming NUTS 2 areas. Thus NUTS 2 of Inner London West UKI11 becoming the NUTS 3 area of UKI3 and likewise: Inner London East (from UKI12 to UKI4), Outer London East and North East (from UKI21 to UKI5), Outer London South (from UKI22 to UKI6) and Outer London West and North West (from UKI23 to UKI7). The NUTS 3 areas are now a single or a group of two or three boroughs.

NUTS 2016 

 UKM2 (Eastern Scotland) is replaced with UKM7 (Eastern Scotland) along with associated NUTS 3 areas
 UKM3 (South Western Scotland) is replaced with UKM8 (West Central Scotland) and UKM9 (Southern Scotland)

ITL 2021 

Following Brexit, the classification used by the ONS was replaced with ITLs. Between 2021 and the next review scheduled for 2024, the ITLs are a mirror of the NUTS classification adopted in 2018. All NUTS codes containing "UK" were changed to use "TL" for Territorial Level.

Local administrative units 

Below the ITL levels, the two LAU (Local Administrative Units) levels are:

The two LAU levels are maintained by the UK Office for National Statistics within the ONS coding system.

The LAU codes of the United Kingdom can be downloaded here: ''

See also 

 Subdivisions of the United Kingdom
 List of regions of the United Kingdom by Human Development Index
 ISO 3166-2 codes of the United Kingdom
 FIPS region codes of the United Kingdom

Sources 

 Metadata Download NUTS (Nomenclature of Territorial Units for Statistics), by regional level (NUTS) accessed 11 June 2012
 Overview map of EU Countries – NUTS level 1
 UNITED KINGDOM – NUTS level 2
 UNITED KINGDOM Center North – NUTS level 3
 UNITED KINGDOM Center South – NUTS level 3
 UNITED KINGDOM North – NUTS level 3
 UNITED KINGDOM South – NUTS level 3
 Correspondence between the NUTS levels and the national administrative units
 List of current NUTS codes 
 Download current NUTS codes (ODS format) 
 Divisions of the United Kingdom, Statoids.com
 Listings of subdivisions of NUTS / LAU areas, Office for National Statistics, accessed 6 September 2012

External links 

 Eurostat Overview of the NUTS classification
 UK Office for National Statistics Guidance on Nomenclature of Territorial Units for Statistics (NUTS) / Local Administrative Units (LAU)

 
Types of subdivision in the United Kingdom
United Kingdom